Helsinki 2006 was a joint bid for the 2006 Winter Olympics presented by the city of Helsinki and Finnish Olympic Committee. Some of the proposed venues were located in Lillehammer, Norway.

Finland does not possess sufficiently high mountains in its territory to host the alpine skiing competitions and thus proposed some events pursuant to Rule 38.2 of the Olympic Charter. Whilst the individual venues were considered to be excellent, the 1000-km distance between Helsinki and Lillehammer, and the fact that a large portion of the Games will be held in Norway, may have led to organisational and operational burdens.

Venues
The proposed venues were spread between two countries:

Finland
 Helsinki - ceremonies, main olympic village, ice hockey (two venues: Hartwall Arena and Barona Areena), speed skating (Myllypuro), figure skating and short track (Helsinki Ice Hall), curling (Pirkkola Arena)
 Lahti - biathlon, ski-jumping, Nordic combined, cross-country skiing, freestyle skiing (Messilä)

Norway
 Lillehammer - Lillehammer Olympic Bobsleigh and Luge Track for bobsleigh, luge and skeleton
 Hafjell - alpine skiing (men's and women's slalom, giant slalom and combined slalom), snowboard
 Kvitfjell - alpine skiing (men's and women's downhill, combined downhill and super-G)

References
Notes

External links

Helsinki 2006 Candidature Files
 Volume 1
 Volume 2
 Volume 3

2006 Winter Olympics bids
Sport in Helsinki